Henry Ainsworth  1571–1622) was a clergyman and scholar.

Henry Ainsworth may also refer to:
Henry Ainsworth (MP) (1502–1556/57), MP for Derby

See also
Harry Ainsworth (1888–1965), British newspaper editor